
William Verstille (ca.1757-1803) was an American artist who worked in Boston, Philadelphia and New York. He specialized in portraits. Examples of his artwork reside in the collections of the Harvard Art Museum, Massachusetts Historical Society, Metropolitan Museum of Art, Museum of Fine Arts Boston, New York Historical Society, Philadelphia Museum of Art, Smithsonian, and Yale University.

References

Further reading

 
 
 Accounts of William Verstille. Connecticut Historical Society Bulletin 25, Jan. 1960

Images

1757 births
1803 deaths
Artists from Boston
Cultural history of Boston
Portrait miniaturists
18th-century American painters
18th-century American male artists
American male painters
19th-century American painters
19th-century American male artists